The 2017–2018 Bikarkeppni kvenna was the 44th edition of the Icelandic Women's Basketball Cup, won by Keflavík against Njarðvík. The competition is managed by the Icelandic Basketball Federation and the final four was held in Reykjavík, in the Laugardalshöll in January 2018. Brittanny Dinkins was named the Cup Finals MVP after turning in 16 points, 11 rebounds, 8 assists and 5 steals.

Participating teams
Thirteen teams signed up for the Cup tournament.

Bracket

Cup Finals MVP

References

External links
2017–2018 Tournament results

Women's Cup